Upton J. C. Johnson (January 1880 – death date unknown) was an American Negro league infielder in the 1900s.

A native of Trenton, New Jersey, Johnson played for the Brooklyn Royal Giants in 1905, and for the Philadelphia Quaker Giants the following season. In 23 recorded games, he posted 12 hits and seven stolen bases in 84 plate appearances.

References

External links
 and Seamheads

1880 births
Date of birth missing
Year of death missing
Place of death missing
Brooklyn Royal Giants players
Baseball infielders
Baseball players from Trenton, New Jersey